John George Lambton, 3rd Earl of Durham  (19 June 1855 – 18 September 1928), known as Viscount Lambton until 1879, was a British peer.

Durham was the eldest twin son of George Lambton, 2nd Earl of Durham, and his wife Lady Beatrix Frances, daughter of James Hamilton, 1st Duke of Abercorn. His grandfather was the statesman and colonial administrator, John Lambton, 1st Earl of Durham, and his great-grandfather was Prime Minister Charles Grey, 2nd Earl Grey.

As a young man he served as a lieutenant in the Coldstream Guards and later became Honorary Colonel of the Durham Heavy Brigade, Royal Artillery, the 6th Battalion Northumberland Fusiliers and the 8th Battalion Durham Light Infantry, and was awarded the Volunteer Decoration. He served as Lord-Lieutenant of County Durham from 1884 to 1928.

Lord Durham visited British India to attend the 1903 Delhi Durbar held in January 1903 to celebrate the succession of King Edward VII as Emperor of India. He was made a Knight of the Garter in 1909 and admitted to the Privy Council in 1911. He bore the Queen Consort's Ivory Rod with Dove at the Coronation of King George V in 1911 and was Lord High Steward to George V during his visit to India from 1911 to 1912.

From 1919 to 1928 he served as chancellor of the University of Durham.

Lord Durham married Ethel Elizabeth Louisa, daughter of Henry Beilby William Milner, in 1882. The marriage was childless, and Lady Durham was committed to a mental institution for most of her adult life.  Lord Durham produced a child, John R. H. Rudge (b. 1892), out of wedlock with the dancer Letty Lind, whom he could not marry because his wife's illness prevented a divorce.  He and Lind were together for many years until her death in 1923.  He died in September 1928, aged 73, and was succeeded in the earldom by his younger twin brother, Frederick. Lady Durham died in 1931.

References

External links

1855 births
1928 deaths
Chancellors of Durham University
Earls in the Peerage of the United Kingdom
Knights Grand Cross of the Royal Victorian Order
Garter Knights appointed by Edward VII
Knights of Justice of the Order of St John
John Lambton, 3rd Earl of Durham
Lord-Lieutenants of Durham
Members of the Privy Council of the United Kingdom